S Sagittae,  also known by the Flamsteed designation of 10 Sagittae, a Classical Cepheid variable in the constellation Sagitta that varies from magnitude 5.24 to 6.04 in 8.382 days. Its variable star designation of "S" indicates that it was the second star discovered to be variable in the constellation. Irish amateur astronomer John Ellard Gore was the first to observe its variability in 1885, and Ralph Hamilton Curtiss discovered its changing radial velocity in 1903–04. Harlow Shapley observed in 1916 that the spectrum of it and other Cepheids varied with its brightness, recording it as spectral type F0 leading to maximum, F4 at maximum, and G3 just before minimum brightness.

S Sagittae is a yellow-white supergiant that varies between spectral types F6Ib and G5Ib. It is around six or seven times as massive and five thousand times as luminous as the Sun and is located around 2,000 light-years away from Earth. Its radius is  58.5 times that of the Sun. The radius, temperature, luminosity, and colour are all variable as the star pulsates during its eight-day period.  The period is slowly increasing.

S Sagittae has been reported as a double or triple system with a hotter main sequence star companion in a 676-day orbit. The companion, and its own possible fainter companion, are only detectable from radial velocity changes in the spectral lines of the Cepheid primary and an ultraviolet excess. Analysis of the spectrum indicates a star of spectral type A7V to F0V, and 1.5 to 1.7 times as massive as the Sun. However, as the mass of the companion is greater than 2.8 solar masses, this strongly suggests this companion is itself a binary star.

References

Sagitta (constellation)
Classical Cepheid variables
G-type supergiants
Sagittae, S
Durchmusterung objects
188727
098085
7609
Sagittae, 10